Troops began wearing berets as a part of the headgear of military uniforms in some European countries during the 19th century; since the mid-20th century, they have become a component of the uniforms of many armed forces throughout the world. Military berets are usually pushed to the right to free the shoulder that bears the rifle on most soldiers, but the armies of some countries, mostly within Europe, South America, and Asia, have influenced the push to the left.

In many countries, berets have become associated with elite units, who often wear berets in specific colours. For instance, the maroon beret is mostly traditional headgear for airborne forces around the world, with a few exceptions—for example, the Russian Airborne Troops, who wear a sky-blue beret, and the Portuguese Paratroopers who wear a green beret.

History

The use of beret-like headgear as a civilian headdress dates back hundreds of years, an early example being the Scottish Blue Bonnet, which became a de facto symbol of Scottish Jacobite forces in the 16th and 17th centuries. Berets themselves were first used as a military headdress in the 1830s during the First Carlist War in Spain, where they were said to have been imported from the South of France by Liberal forces, but were made famous by the opposing General Tomás de Zumalacárregui, who sported a white or red beret with a long tassel, which came to be an emblem of the Carlist cause.

The French Chasseurs alpins, created in the early 1880s, were the first regular unit to wear the military beret as a standard headgear. These mountain troops were issued with a uniform which included several features which were innovative for the time, notably the large and floppy blue beret which they still retain. This was so unfamiliar a fashion outside France that it had to be described in the Encyclopædia Britannica of 1911 as "a soft cap or tam o'shanter".

Berets have features that make them attractive to the military; they are cheap, easy to make in large numbers, can be manufactured in a wide range of colors encouraging esprit de corps, can be rolled up and stuffed into a pocket or beneath the shirt epaulette without damage, and can be worn with headphones.

The beret was found particularly practical as a uniform for armored vehicle crews; the British Royal Tank Regiment adopted a black beret which would not show oil stains and was officially approved in 1924. German Panzertruppen also adopted a black beret or Schutzmütze in 1934, which included a rubber skull cap as head protection inside.

The wearing of berets of distinctive colors by elite special forces originated with the British Parachute Regiment, whose maroon beret was officially approved in July 1942, followed by the Commando Forces whose green beret was approved in October of that year. The United States Army Special Forces adopted a darker green beret in 1955, although it was not officially approved until 1961.

By country

A

Afghanistan

Most berets were used by senior enlisted personnel and officers.

Algeria

Light green berets are used by para-commando units.

Angola

In the Angola Armed Forces, the following berets are in use:

Argentina
Berets are worn by some units in the Argentine Armed Forces, with distinctive colors for some units or functions. The beret colours are as follows:

Armenia
The Armed Forces continue to wear Soviet-style (pieced fabric) berets, which are draped to the right in most circumstances. When appearing in public on parade, the berets are draped to the left side so that the insignia shows to observing dignitaries and the public.
 Light blue – Airborne Forces, Peacekeeping Forces
 Black – Police Troops
 Wine red – Police Special Troops
 Bright green – Border Guards

Australia
In all service branches, the beret is "bashed" to the right and a badge or insignia is worn above the left eye. In the army, all units can wear them with certain units wearing unique ones. In the navy, the beret is an optional item and in the air force, it is only worn by certain units.

Austria

The Austrian coat of arms is worn on the left side of the beret (officers in gold, NCOs in silver, enlisted personnel as well as conscripts in dark grey). An exception are members of the special forces: after successfully completing the Basic Special Forces Course, they wear the Special Forces Badge instead of the coat of arms on their berets.

Azerbaijan

B

Bahrain
Black – Royal Bahraini Army and Royal Bahraini Naval Force
Blue – Royal Bahraini Air Force
Red – Military Police
Tan – Special Forces
Green – Royal Guard
Olive green – National Guard
Maroon – Public Security Forces
Dark blue – Coast Guard
Dark green – Harasat

Bangladesh

Belgium

Since World War II they have been adopted by all units. Berets vary in colour according to the regiment, and carry a badge (sometimes on a coloured shield-shaped patch) which is of gilt for officers, silver for non-commissioned officers and bronze for other ranks. Members of cavalry units all wear silver-coloured badges.

Benin

Bolivia

Berets in Bolivian Army:
Black – Paratroopers
Maroon – Armoured Corps
Green – Special Operations Forces, Commandos
 Camouflage – Special Forces "Bolivian Condors"
Tan – Mountain Infantry (Satinadores de Montaña)
 Blue – Engineer units
Berets in Bolivian Air Force:
 Royal blue – Air Force Infantry personnel

Brazil

Bulgaria
Berets have been worn by Bulgarian military personnel since 1991. Berets vary in colour according to the military branch, and carry a crest pin (sometimes on a coloured background patch) resembling the unit's insignia.

 Red – Bulgarian Land Forces and the counter-terrorism police detachment SOBT
 Light blue – Bulgarian Air Force and the 68th Special Forces Brigade
 Black – Bulgarian Navy SOF and the Gendarmerie
 Green – Military police

C

Cambodia

Dark red – 911 Special Forces Regiment
Royal purple – Military Police

Cameroon
 Bataillon des Troupes Aéroportées (Airborne Battalion) – Dark red/maroon
 Bataillon Spécial Amphibie (Special Amphibious Battalion) – Dark green
 Bataillon d'Intervention Rapide (Rapid Intervention Battalion) – Light green
 Fusiliers de l'Air (Air Force Infantry) – Royal blue
 Fusiliers Marins (Marine Infantry) – Black
 Garde Presidentielle (Presidential Guard) – Royal purple
All others army units – Navy blue
Gendarmerie (Military Police) – Red

Canada

The colour of the beret is determined by the wearer's environment, branch, or mission. The beret colours listed below are the current standard:

Chile

Berets in Chilean Army:
 Black – Special Operations Brigade "Lautaro" (Commandos, Paratroopers and Special Combatants)
 Maroon – Armoured Cavalry
 Green – Mountain troops
 Olive green – Aviation Brigade

Berets in Chilean Navy:
 Black – Combat Divers, combat crews and Maritime Boarding and Police operatives
 Green – Marine special forces

Berets in Chilean Air Force:
 Dark blue – Parachuting demonstration group Boinas Azules and Ground troops
 Black – Special forces

China
Since May 5, 2000, the People's Liberation Army has adopted woolen berets for all its personnel, along with the traditional peaked caps.
Type 99 beret
Olive green – Ground Forces and Strategic Forces
Dark blue – Navy
Black – Marine corps
Blue-grey – Air Force (including Airborne troops)
Berets were not officially adopted by the CAPF, but some of the forces issued their own types
NOT OFFICIAL:
Red – CAPF Provincial Women Special Police Corps
Dark blue – Public Security Police SWAT

During the 80s, camo berets were issued to some of the recon forces of PLA. It has no badge on it.

Type 07 uniform is being issued to both PLA and CAPF on August 1, 2007.
Colours of 07 berets are changed to the same colours with the service uniform. And several changes in designs were made from type 99 beret. The berets were not being issued until summer of 2009 to most of the troops.

Other than colours of the berets, the most significant difference between type 99 and type 07 is the type 99 beret badge is cloth, while type 07 is plastic.

Colombia

Berets are worn by all personnel of the National Army of Colombia (Ejército), certain members of the Navy (Armada) and National Police (Policía Nacional), with distinctive colors for some units or functions. The beret colors are:

Croatia
In the Croatian Army berets are used in special forces and guard brigades, as well as in cadet battalion. 
During Croatian War of Independence, Croatian Army consisted of seven professional brigades—guard brigades, each having its beret colour. During the army reforms number of guard brigades was cut to two, but the battalions kept the names and insignia (colour of beret also) of ex brigades.

Joint staff:
Green with golden cap badge – Joint staff
Red – Presidential guard on their battledress uniforms
Green (badge on the right) – Special Operations Battalion
Black – Military Police

Guard brigades:
Armored Mechanized Guard Brigade
Black – 1st Mechanized Battalion "Sokolovi"
Brown – 2nd Mechanized Battalion "Pume"
Black – Tank Battalion "Kune"
Motorized Guard Brigade
Black – 1st Mechanized Battalion "Tigrovi"
Green – 2nd Mechanized Battalion "Gromovi"
Black – 1st Motorized Battalion "Vukovi"
Red – 2nd Motorized Battalion "Pauci"

Black beret is also used in Cadet battalion.
Also dark blue beret is used in Croatian Navy.

Cuba
In the Cuban Revolutionary Armed Forces, the following berets are in use:

Czech Republic

The Armed Forces of the Czech Republic use berets for both battledress and display uniform. The colour of the beret signifies the branch of the armed forces. The beret displays the Czech Army badge (silver for NCOs and enlisted, gold for officers, gold with linden branchlets for generals) and the rank of the individual.

In 2023 the Czech Armed Forces updated the colours of their berets, completely discontinuing the orange beret for the Rescue and Civil defence forces (disbanded) and adopting two new colours: blue for the Prague Castle Guard and khaki for the Ground forces (including the 4th Rapid reaction brigade, formerly wearing the maroon berets), both replacing the previous and broadly unpopular light green beret.

D

Denmark 
The Royal Danish Army first introduced the black berets for its armour personnel in 1958. In 1968 it was extended to the whole army, Homeguard and parts of the Navy and Airforce, replacing the standard issue Side cap.

E

Ecuador

Berets are worn by all personnel of the Ecuadorian Army (Ejército) and certain members of the Navy (Armada) and Air Force (Fuerza Aérea), with distinctive colours for some units or functions. The beret colours are:

Egypt

 Maroon – Paratroopers
 Forest green – Armour
 Dark blue – Infantry
 Dark blue with red band – Presidential Guard
 Black – Artillery
 Red – Military Police
 Green – Engineers

Eritrea
All personnel of the EDF or Eritrean Defense Forces wear Berets.

 Red – Air Force Units
 Green – Army Units
 Blue – Naval Units
 Purple – Border Guard

Estonia
All personnel in the Estonian Military used to wear Berets in the beginning on 90's. In 2013, berets were reinstated.

Green – Ground Forces
Black – Armoured Corps, Naval Units
Slate – Air Force
Red – Military police
White – Military Bands Service when not in parade dress uniform

F

Finland

The Finnish Defence Force uses berets with cap badges for the Army, Navy and the Air Force. The berets are worn in "clean" garrison duties such as roll calls and with the walking-out uniform, but not with the battle dress. Until the mid-1990s, the beret was reserved for troops with special status, such as the armoured troops, coastal jägers and the airborne jägers, but is nowadays used by all units. In winter, berets are replaced by winter headgear.

Berets are also used by the Finnish Border Guard, which is a military organization under the aegis of the Ministry of Interior during peacetime.

 Brown (badge: golden bear's head, sword and fir tree twig) – Special Border Jägers
 Olive (badge: golden bear's head, sword and fir tree twig) – Border Jägers
 Olive (badge: silver lion's head) – Army
 Olive (badge: golden lion's head with crown) – Finnish Rapid Deployment Force and Army units abroad (other than UN peace keepers)
 UN blue (badge: UN white and blue embroidered patch) – UN peace keepers
 Black (badge: silver Gothic helmet) – Armoured Brigade
 Burgundy (badge: arrow and parachute) – Airborne Jägers of the Utti Jäger Regiment
 Royal blue (badge: silver griffin) – Army helicopter pilots
 Royal blue (badge: silver Air Force insignia) – Air Force
 Royal blue (badge: golden harp with sword) – Military bands
 Navy blue (badge: silver anchor and golden lion) – Navy, including coastal troops, except for Coastal Jägers
 Dark green (badge: gold sea eagle's head) – Coastal Jägers

France

[[File:Fanfare 27BCA 03 (cropped).JPG|alt=|thumb|Chasseurs Alpinss distinct wide beret]]
The military beret originated in the French Army, in the form of the wide and floppy headdress worn by the Chasseurs Alpins (mountain light infantry) from their foundation in the early 1880s.
The practical uses of the beret were soon recognised and the Marine Infantry forming part of the Expeditionary Force sent in China in 1900 used berets as headwear A tight-fitting version was subsequently adopted by French armoured troops towards the end of World War I. Between the wars, special fortress units raised to garrison the Maginot Line wore khaki berets as did the 13th Demi-Brigade of Foreign Legion when it was created in 1940. The Vichy Milice of the War period wore a blue beret.

The beret in blue, red or green was a distinction respectively of the Metropolitan, Colonial and Legion paratrooper units during the Indochina and Algerian wars. In 1962 the beret in either light khaki or the colours specified above became the standard French Army headdress for ordinary use.

With the exception of the Commandos Marine and the Fusiliers Marins, whose berets are worn pulled to the right, all other French military berets (army, air force and Gendarmerie) are pulled to the left with the badge worn over the right eye or temple. Also the military forces of the countries that have historical, colonial, or cooperative ties with France such as Algeria, Burkina Faso, Cameroon, Central African Republic, Chad, Congo, Côte d'Ivoire, Gabon, Lebanon, Mali, Mauritania, Morocco, Niger, Sénégal, Togo, Tunisia or have been trained by the French military wear their beret pulled left.

Gendarmerie personnel serving with the European Gendarmerie Force (EUROGENDFOR) an EU crisis response and intervention force wear the standard EUROGENDFOR royal blue beret and badge when so assigned.

G
Gabon
Berets in Gabonese Army:

 Dark red/rouge – Paratroopers
 Light grey – Armoured troops
 Green – Republican Guard
 Green – Commandos Marine
 Dark red – Army Medical Corps
 Dark blue – Other Army units

Germany

The German Heer uses berets with different badges for every branch of service. The Luftwaffe and the Marine issue dark blue berets only to their ground or land combat units (called Luftwaffensicherungstruppe and Marineschutzkräfte) respectively. Berets are usually worn at special ceremonies and roll calls, although units with a special esprit de corps, especially armoured and mechanized infantry (Panzergrenadiere) battalions, wear their berets all the time. German berets are always pulled to the right, with the badge visible over the left temple.

Military bands wear the beret colour of their respective division (e.g. black in the 1st Panzerdivision).

Ghana
The beret colours worn by the Ghana Army are as follows:
Black – Armoured Corps, Artillery Corps
Dark green – Airborne Force (ABF)
Red – Military Police
Midnight blue – All other Arms and Corps
Tan – Special Forces

Greece
The beret colours worn by the Hellenic Army are as follows:
Light blue – Presidential Guard
Black – Armoured Corps
Green – Special Forces (including Commandos, Marines and Parachute despatchers/riggers)
Dark red/maroon – Army Aviation
Bright red/scarlet — Airmobile troops
Dark blue – All other Arms and Corps when in 8a, 8b and 8c Service Dress
Red – 71st Airmobile Brigade (PONDUS)
When in camouflage fatigues, the camouflaged cap is worn instead of the dark blue beret.
The beret colours worn by the Hellenic Air Force are:

Blue-grey (same colours as RAF) – Air Force Underwater Operations Squadron
Dark red/maroon – Air Force Special Operations Squadron

Guatemala

Black – Parachute Brigade (Brigada Paracaidista)
Maroon – Kaibiles (Special Forces)

H
Hungary
History: the first beret-type cap (khaki colour, with black ribbon and "eagle" badge) was issued for Air Force enlisted personnel in 1930, but berets became popular in the 1970s, when reconnaissance troops (paratroopers) were issued with rifle green (or grass green) berets. Previously maroon beret was also experimented and even reversible (green to camo) "multi-purpose" berets were produced, but the standardization started on the 1975 military parade. In 1982 military secondary school students were issued with green berets too, while in 1987 River Force troopers received dark blue beret. After the collapse of the communism the beret as "mark of the elite trooper" received more and more popularity among soldiers. Light green (with border guard's badge) berets were issued for Border Guard reaction forces between 1990 and 2007. The berets of Hungarian forces were made first in "eastern-european style" (like worn by most Warsaw Pact armies), sewn together from 4 pieces. After 1993 "western style" one-piece berets were adopted.

Berets currently in Hungarian military:
Black (with tank troops' badge) – Armoured Units
Black (with – battalion number – numbered oak leaf badge) – Territorial Voluntary Reserve Forces
Black (with anchor badge) – River Forces
Scarlet red (with MP badge) – Military Police
Scarlet red (with artillery or AA badge) – Artillery, Anti-Aircraft Artillery
Rifle green (with paratroops badge) – Paratroopers, Long-range recons, Field recons
Rifle green (with engineer's badge) – Engineers
Rifle green (with infantry badge) – Infantry (only in foreign missions)
Dark brown (with infantry badge) – Guard Battalion Special Team (only in the 2000s, discontinued)
Tan (with special operation's badge) – 2nd "Vitéz Bertalan Árpád" Special Operations Brigade
Maroon (carmine red) (with LC badge) – Logistic Corps (issued in 2020)

Except these, mission-type berets were/are used in international peacekeeping missions (UN blue, EBECS yellow, MFO brick red etc.) worn. Beside the official versions different unofficial beret types, colours and badges are worn, for example Dark Blue berets by Signal Corps cadets etc.

I
Iceland
Icelandic armed services commonly use berets.

India

The beret is the standard headgear for the Various forces of Indian Armed Forces. Berets are worn by officers and Other ranks, apart from Sikhs, who wear turbans. The beret colours worn by the Indian Army are as follows:

Light green (shades vary considerably) – Infantry regiments and Directorate of Military Intelligence (India) 
Dark (rifle) green – Rifle Regiments, some Light Infantry regiments (including the Mechanised Infantry Regiment), Assam Rifles, Commando Battalion for Resolute Action, and National Cadet Corps (India)
Maroon – The Parachute Regiment, Para (Special Forces), Special Frontier Force, Garud Commando Force, MARCOS, Special Group
Black – Indian Army Armoured Corps, Border Security Force, National Security Guards, Indian Navy, Indian Coast Guard and Military Nursing Service
Bluish grey – Army Aviation Corps, Cadets of Training Academies of Army and Indian Air Force NC(e)
Scarlet – Corps of Military Police (India), Naval Police and Air Force Police
Navy blue – Regiment of Artillery, Indian Army Corps of Engineers, Indian Army Corps of Signals, Corps of Army Air Defence (India), All Service arms of Indian Army, Defence Security Corps, Indo-Tibetan Border Police, Central Industrial Security Force, Central Reserve Police Force, Sashastra Seema Bal and Railway Protection Force 
Sand – Border Road Organisation
Dark blue – National Disaster Response Force
Light blue – All personnel serving with the United Nations forces irrespective of unit, arm or service

Indonesia

The beret is the standard headgear of armed forces and police personnel in Indonesia. It is also worn by paramilitary and other uniformed services in the country such as the Fire Brigade, Search and Rescue, Scouts, civil militias (such as Banser) and civil paramilitary organizations. In the Military Services (Army, Navy and Air Force), the berets are dragged to the right (the insignia are worn on the left side), while in the Indonesian National Police force and Military Police Corps, the berets are dragged to the left (the insignia are worn on the right side). Both having its own meaning, dragged to the right meaning "ready for combat and defense" and dragged to the left meaning "ready for law enforcement and order". 
Military and Police services according to their beret colours which represent different units within the force are as shown below:
Indonesian Army (TNI AD)
Green – Army HQ, Territorial Army, regular Infantry, and Army staff
Red – Army Special Forces Command ("Kopassus"), including Para-Commandos
Dark Green – Raider Infantry air-mobile units, Mechanized Infantry
Green – Strategic Reserve Command Corps ("Kostrad") which itself includes infantry brigades, Airborne/Para brigades, reconnaissance platoons, cavalry and artillery battalions.
Black – Cavalry and Armored Cavalry (tank) Corps
Brown – Field Artillery Corps and Air Defense Artillery Corps
Green – Corps of Engineers (previously steel grey)
Red maroon – Army Aviation Corps (previously maroon/brick red later switched to green for 11 years and switched back to red maroon)
Green – Signal Corps (previously khaki)
Green – Logistics and Transportation Corps (previously dark blue)
Indonesian Navy (TNI AL)
Navy blue – Standard berets for the Navy, worn by all personnel such as Naval seamen and naval sailors in duty of ships' company, or on the Naval bases.
Black – Submarine Forces
Dark Blue – Naval Aviation, Underwater Rescue Service, Naval Hydro-Oceanography Center
Reddish purple (magenta) – Marine Corps and Joint naval special forces (Jala Mengkara Detachment)
Maroon – Frogman Command
Indonesian Air Force (TNI AU)
Dark blue – Standard berets for the Air Force, with Air Force insignia worn by Airmen and Air Force staff
Orange – Air Force Infantry Quick Reaction Forces Command (Kopasgat)
Inter-services
Black – All personnel in Armed Forces/TNI HQ
Light blue (beret dragged to the left) – Military Police personnel from all branches (Army, Navy, Air Force)
Light blue – All personnel attached in United Nations' Peace Keeping Force (Garuda Contingent), and the Presidential Security Force (Paspampres)
Red – Special Operations Command
Dark brown – Cadets and midshipmen of the Indonesian Military, Naval, and Air Force Academies
Light brown – Armed Forces Reserve Component (since 2022)

Indonesian National Police (paramilitary, not part of the armed forces / TNI), all Police berets are dragged to the left unless noted
Dark blue - Mobile Brigade Corps (Brimob)
Dark brown – Patrol Units (Sabhara), Canine Units, Music, Security Services
Ultramarine – Water and Aerial Units
Light blue – Internal Affairs and Provost, U.N. Police with U.N. beret which dragged to the right
Maroon – Cadets of the Indonesian Police Academy
Non-military
Dark brown – Scouts
Light brown – Ministry of Defence employees and Armed Forces Civil Servants (PNS), beret dragged to the left
Purple – College Students Regiment

Iran

Iraq

The beret color system used for the different branches of the Iraqi military and security forces changed after the fall of Saddam Hussein.
Beret colors currently (and formerly) worn by Iraqi forces are as follows:
 Maroon – Army (formerly Special Republican Guards, Paratroops and/or Special Forces)
 Khaki (olive green) – No longer used (formerly Logistics and Transport personnel)
 Green – Special Forces (formerly Commandos and Thunder Paratroops)
 Bright red – Military Police
 Black – Police (formerly Republican Guards and regular Army)
 Blue – Air Force
 Dark Blue – Iraqi Navy
 Blue-Grey – No longer worn (formerly Iraqi Air Force)

Ireland

All Army personnel wear a common capbadge, a sunburst insignia with the letters "FF" inscribed above the left eye of the beret. The Irish Defence Forces cap badge for Officers in the Army has a more subdued appearance.
Air Corps and Naval Service personnel wear their own cap badge on berets.

The beret colours worn by the Irish Defence Forces are as follows:

The beret colours worn by the Reserve Defence Forces'' are as follows:

Israel

Israeli Defense Forces soldiers wear berets only on formal occasions, such as ceremonies and roll calls, and in disciplinary situations such as courts martial and imprisonments. While they are not attending formal occasions, they must place the beret beneath the left epaulette. The Border Police, which are a unit of the civil police rather than the military IDF, wear their berets at most times. The beret colors are as follows:

Italy

Italian Army personnel used to wear a garrison cap alongside the combination cap, until the early 1970s when the garrison cap was replaced by the beret. Until the early 1980s the general Army colour for the beret was drab khaki, the black being reserved to armoured units. The colours presently used by the Italian Army are as follows:

 Maroon – Paratroopers, Folgore Airborne Brigade
 Light blue – Army Aviation, 66th Airmobile Infantry Regiment
 Black – All other Army units (the Bersaglieri light infantry have royal blue beret strings, instead of black ones like the rest of the Italian Military)
 Green – The Lagunari Serenissima amphibious infantry Regiment received 'Lagoon green' berets in 2011 after service in Afghanistan
 Green asparagus – Army Incursori Special Operations Forces

The Italian Navy uses the following berets:

 Green – Navy Commando frogmen Operational Raider Group (COMSUBIN GOI)
 Medium blue – Navy Rescue frogmen Operational Divers Group (COMSUBIN GOS)
 Navy blue – San Marco Marine Brigade of the Italian Navy
 Orange – Units part of the Multinational Force and Observers mission in Sinai

The Italian Air Force uses the following berets:

 Teal blue – Air Force guards
 Tan – Air Force Incursori (RIAM)

Other Italian services that use berets:

 Maroon – Carabinieri Tuscania Airborne Regiment; Police di Stato Parachute units (Display Team and NOCS)
 Green – Guardia di Finanza (GICO); Corpo Forestale dello Stato
 Light blue – Prison Police
 Dark blue – Carabinieri (MP units)
 Red – Carabinieri Cacciatori Hunter units
 Grey – Guardia di Finanza
 Blue – Polizia di Stato

J
Japan

All members in the Ground Self-Defense Force are authorized to wear wool rifle green berets – referred to as the "ベレー帽" (ベレーボウ　or bereebou) – as an optional head covering for dress, working and camouflage uniforms since 1992. However, it is normally considered a special dress item, worn for public relations events or parades. An embroidered goldwork cap badge representing the JGSDF logo identical to the one used on the service dress peaked cap is required by regulation to be affixed to the beret.

Jordan
The beret colours worn by the Jordanian Army are as follows:
Brown – Infantry
Maroon – Special Forces
Black – Armoured Corps
Green – Royal Guards
Dark blue – Artillery
Sky-blue – Engineers
Red – Military police
Grey blue – Air Force
Dark blue – Navy

K
Kazakhstan
Light blue – Paratroops
Maroon – National Guard – Internal security
Orange – Emergency Rescue Units
Navy blue – Navy Units

Kenya

The beret colours worn by the Kenya Armed Forces are as follows:

 Black – Armoured Corps
 Green – Airborne Battalion
 Red – Military police
 Dark blue – All other Arms and Corps including naval service
 Blue grey – Air Force

Kuwait

 Green – Kuwait National Guard
 Olive green – National Guard Training Institute
 Commando green – 25th Commandos Brigade
 Black – Army Ground Forces and Navy Forces
 Police black – Ministry of Interior and National Assembly Guard
 Fire black – Fire Force and Logistics Support
 Dark blue – General Fire Department (Former)
 Red – Military Police
 Maroon – Amiri Guard Authority
 Commando maroon – 67th Special Operations Battalion
 Blue – Aviation
 Air Force blue – Air Force
 Light blue – Fire Force Prevention Sector
 Commando blue – Special Forces
 Khaki Tan – Military College

L
Latvia

The beret colours worn by the Latvian Army are as follows:
Olive green – Special Tasks Unit
Red – Military police
Black – National Guard, Navy
Tan – Mechanized infantry brigade (army) from 18.11.2018
Blue – Air Force

Lebanon
All units in the Lebanese Armed Forces wear berets when not in combat mode (helmet), training camp (cap) or formal uniform (formal hat).

The Lebanese Army, unlike most militaries, wears the beret slanted (pulled down) on the left side as the army emblem is positioned to the right aligned with the right eyebrow.

 Green – The Intervention Regiments (SF) (6 Regiments)
 Brown – Airborne Regiment (SF)
 Red – Military Police
 Black – All 11 army brigades
 Maroon beret – Rangers Regiment  (SF), Marine Commandos  (SF)
 Dark blue – The Mobile Gendarmerie Unit in the Lebanese Internal Security Forces
 Tan – The reconnaissance and intervention unit in the Lebanese General Security

Lithuania

 Maroon – National Defence Volunteer Forces
 Scarlet – Military Police
 Green – All other forces excluding the Air Force and the Navy
 Grey – (SOP-Specialiųjų operacijų pajėgos) SOF – Special operations force
 Black – Engineers
 Dark blue – Anti Aircraft forces

M
Malaysia

The beret is the headgear of ground forces, air aviations and special forces in the Malaysian Armed Forces. The colours presently used are:

Maldives
The beret colours worn by the Maldives National Defense Force (MNDF) are as follows:
 Maroon – Special Forces
 Red – Military Police
 Green – Marines and other support units
 Black – Parade Beret for Coast Guard

Mali

The beret colours worn by the Malian Armed Forces are as follows:
 Red – Paratroopers
 Brown – National Guard
 Green – Infantry and other army units
 Dark blue – Air Force
 Blue – Police

Mexico

In the Mexican Army, the beret is worn by:
 Green – Special Forces
 Maroon – Paratroopers (formerly purple, circa 1980s)
 Black – Presidential Guards Corps
 Steel Grey – Armor
 Brown – Airmobile Units

In the Mexican Navy:
 Black – Paratroopers, Navy Special Forces

Armed Forces wide, the blue beret with the UN arms is used by peacekeeping forces beginning in 2015–16, when Mexico sent armed forces personnel to UN peacekeeping operations.

Mongolia
In 2002, new army uniforms were introduced to the Mongolian armed forces and along with new uniform design, dark green berets were issued to all personnel. According to the rules, all military berets are pushed to the right and displays a "Soyombo" symbol in middle of golden oak leaves in the right side.

Berets are worn by Mongolian Police since 1994. Police berets are different from the army beret in color and in shape, while it is pushed to the left while army berets are pushed to the right.

 Dark green – All branches of Armed forces
 Red – Internal troops
 Dark blue – National emergency troops (rescuers)
 Black – Police unit (pushed to the left)
 Light blue – UN peacekeepers (pushed to the right)

Morocco
The Moroccan military Uniform is inspired from the French Uniform, the berets are usually pulled to the left with the badge worn over the right eye or temple.

Lime green – Armed Forces (Les Forces armees royales), including Paratroopers
Red – Royal Guard (La garde royale)
Blue – Royal Moroccan air force
Dark blue – The Air Force and Security Forces
UN blue – Moroccan-United Nations troops Personnel serving with the United Nations on international peacekeeping missions
Brown – Moroccan Auxiliary troops

Mozambique

Presently, the following berets are in use by the Defense Armed Forces of Mozambique:
Brown – Army general use
Red – Commandos
Olive Green – Forcas Especiais (Special Forces)
Navy blue – Fuzileiros (Marines)

N

Namibia

Nepal

 Deep Green: Nepalese Army
 Maroon: Nepal Police
 Grey: Armed Police Force

Netherlands

When the Royal Netherlands Armed Forces acquired new modernised uniforms (designed by the Dutch couturier Frans Molenaar) in 2000, the berets changed as well. Since 2004, soldiers of the Royal Netherlands Army have worn a petrol (blue-green) beret, whereas previously they wore brown.

The following colours are also used (before and after the modernisation):

Navy:
 Dark navy blue with a bronze metal crown & anchor on a red flash – Royal Netherlands Marine Corps
 Dark navy blue with a gold color metal anchor on a black flash – Royal Netherlands Navy
 Dark navy blue with a silver color metal anchor on a Blue flash – Civilian base security for the Royal Netherlands Navy
Army:
 Green (The Green Beret) – Commandos of the Korps Commandotroepen
 Maroon (The Red Beret) – Airmobile troops of the 11 Air Manoeuvre Brigade "11 Luchtmobiele Brigade" (Air Assault)
 Black – Armour and Cavalry
 Petrol (blue-green) – Royal Netherlands Army
Note: The only Dutch military unit that do not wear a beret are the Gele Rijders (Horse Artillery), who wear a blue garrison cap with yellow trimming.

Air Force:
 Grey-blue – Royal Netherlands Air Force

Military Police:
 Bright blue – with emblem Koninklijke Marechaussee (Royal Gendarmerie)
Other:
 UN blue – All military members of the United Nations
 Brick red – All military members of the Multinational Force and Observers
 Dark blue – 1(GE/NL)Corps (Eerste Duits-Nederlandse Legerkorps)

All regiments and services have their own distinctive colours. There are quite a lot, but the number of colours in the logistic services was reduced in 2001. This colour is shown in a patch of cloth behind the beret flash. The intendance (maroon), transport troops (blue), military administration (pink; hence the nickname 'Pink Mafia'), technical service (black), and medical troops and service (green) lost their colours and all now wear yellow patches. In 2010, the technical service and medical troops and services recovered their colors. The intendance and transport troops merched into one regiment with new colours (maroon with blue border) and the administration got the crimson color.

Infantry – Red, except:
Grenadier Guards – Red with blue border
Rifle Guards – Green with yellow border
Fusilier Guards – Orange with blue border
Regiment van Heutsz – Black with orange border
Limburg Rifles Regiment – Green with maroon border
Korps Commandotroepen – Black with dark green border
Cavalry (Armour) – Blue with white, red or orange border
Cavalry (Reconnaissance) – Blue with black border
Artillery – Black with red border
Engineers – Brown
Signals – Blue with white border
Logistics – Yellow (obsolete since 2010)
Legal Affairs – Black with white border
Psychological and Sociological Service – Red
Protestant Chaplains – Black
Catholic Chaplains – Blue
Jewish Chaplains – Black
Humanist Society Chaplains – Bright green
Hindu Chaplains – Bright blue
Troops in Initial Training – Red
Royal Military Academy Cadets – Red with yellow border
Physical Training Instructors – Blue
Technical Staff – Maroon

New Zealand

Royal New Zealand Navy –

Dark blue – Military police
Dark blue/black – All other branches

New Zealand Army –

Pre 2002 beret colours –

Khaki – Royal Regiment of New Zealand Artillery
Green – Royal New Zealand Infantry Regiment
Jet black – Royal New Zealand Armoured Corps
Royal blue – Royal New Zealand Military Police
Red – Regular Force Cadet School
Rifle green – Royal New Zealand Corps of Signals
Grey – Royal New Zealand Nursing Corps
Cypress green – New Zealand Intelligence Corps
Sand or 'ecru' – New Zealand Special Air Service
Dark blue – All other corps

Post 2002 beret colours –

Sand or 'ecru' – New Zealand Special Air Service
Dark blue – Royal New Zealand Military Police
Rifle green – All other corps

Royal New Zealand Air Force –

The RNZAF does not currently wear berets except for:

Dark blue – Military police

Nicaragua
The Nicaraguan Armed Forces wear berets in the following colours:

Berets in Nicaraguan Army:
 Green – Special Forces (COE)
 Black – Generals of Staff's Protection VIP
Berets in Nicaraguan Navy:
 Dark blue – Special Naval Forces

Nigeria
 Dark green – Infantry soldier
 Light red – Military Police
 Dark red – Medical
 Dark blue – Artillery
 Black – Engineering
 White – Provost

Norway

The Norwegian armed forces use the beret as a garrison cap, but some units (mostly armored vehicle personnel) also use it in the field. The Norwegian beret and all other headwear except those of the Navy and His Majesty The King's Guard always have the current king's cipher as a badge in gold (most of the army) or silver (the air force); currently this is a numeral 5 inside an H, for "Harald V". The navy has a crowned gold anchor for their enlisted personnel, a crowned gold anchor surrounded by a circle of rope for their petty officers, and a crowned golden anchor surrounded by leaved branches for officers. The colours used are:
 Royal blue – Brigade Nord (except cavalry troops, intelligence troops and military police)
 Umbra green – Border Guards
 Black – Cavalry, armoured battalion and KESK
 Khaki – Norwegian Army 2nd Battalion
 Emerald green – Telemark Battalion
 Maroon – Army Ranger Command
 Red – Military police
 Olive green – Formerly used by other army units & Home Guard
 Grey – Home Guard
 Olive green with silver badge – Recruits in His Majesty's The Kings Guards; Krigsskolen
 Dark blue – Royal Norwegian Navy
 Air Force blue — Royal Norwegian Air Force Base Defence Units
 Air Force light blue – Royal Norwegian Air Force Air Defence Artillery Units

The special operations units of the Navy wear the same berets as the rest of the navy. However they have a coloured patch behind the cap badge, the colour of which determines the unit:

 Green – Marinejegerkommandoen
 Blue – Minedykkerkommandoen
 Maroon – Kystjegerkommandoen
 Red – Military Police

 O 

 Oman 
The Royal Omani Armed Forces wears the beret as its standard headgear. Each color divisions are as follows:

P
Pakistan

Rifle green – Frontier Force Regiment, Defence Services Guards
Rifle green with cherry color patch behind the badge – Baloch Regiment
Green with green plume – Punjab Regiment
Cherry Pink with a red feather hackle – Sindh Regiment
Green with red patch behind badge – Azad Kashmir Regiment
Chitrali style with white feather – Northern Light Infantry
Black – Regiments of Armored Corps
Dark blue – Regiment of Artillery, Corps of Electrical and Mechanical Engineers, Corps of Signals
Maroon – Army Air Defence, Army Aviation Corps
Light blue – Pakistan Army Corps of Engineers, Army Services Corps
Red – Pakistan Army Medical Corps, Military Police
Dark maroon – Special Service Group (SSG)
Green with red plume – Pakistan Military Academy Cadets
Dark blue – Worn by the General Staff officers (rank of Colonel and above) irrespective of their Regimental association.

Paraguay
The Paraguayan Armed Forces wear berets in the following colours:

Berets in Paraguayan Army:
 Green – Paratroopers
 Dark blue – Presidential Guard
Berets in Paraguayan Navy:
 Camouflage – Special Naval Forces
Berets in Paraguayan Air Force:
 Red – Air Force Infantry and Airborne personnel

Panama
Berets were widely worn by many units in the Panama Defense Forces (PDF) under Manuel Noriega. The PDF was abolished in February 1990, and with it all of the old military units stood down. Unique beret insignia were never approved, so units authorized to wear berets wore a combination of the approved shoulder insignia, as well as rank and qualification insignia (e.g. parachutist wings) on the berets. The following were being worn at the time of the 1989 invasion:
 Black – 7th Infantry Company "Macho de Monte"; Comando Operacional de Fuerzas Expeciales (COFFEE - Special Forces Command)
 Maroon – Battalion 2000; 2nd Airborne Infantry Company "Puma"; 3rd Infantry Company "Diablo Rojo"
 Lime green – 4th Infantry Company "Urraca"
 Camouflage – 7th Infantry Company "Macho de Monte"; Comando Operacional de Fuerzas Expeciales (Cadre)

Philippines

Poland

Black berets were introduced before World War II for tank and armoured car crews. During World War II, berets were widely adopted in the Polish Army on the Western Front, armored troops – black, airborne – grey, commando – green. After the war in the communist era, berets were worn only by armoured units (black), navy for field and work uniform (black), paratroopers (maroon), and marines (light blue). After 1990, the beret became the standard headgear in the Armed Forces of Republic of Poland. Around the year 2000 the design of the Polish Army Beret changed, the beret sewn together from three pieces of material with four air holes, two at each side was changed to a smaller beret molded from one piece of material with no air holes.
The following colours are in use:

Berets in other ministries:

The black beret is also the distinctive headgear of World War II veterans, particularly Armia Krajowa veterans.

The dress code of the Polish armed forces states than when not worn on the head or kept in a locker the beret should be placed under the left shoulder loop. This practice was discontinued due to introducing new field uniform (wz. 2010) with rank insignia placed on chest.

 Portugal 

The beret was first introduced in the Portuguese Armed Forces in 1956, when the Air Force Paratroopers adopted the green beret. The Portuguese Army adopted the brown beret for its Caçadores Especiais special forces in 1960, generalizing its wear to all units in 1962.

The following colors of berets were or are still worn by the Portuguese Military and Paramilitary forces:

R
Rhodesia

Zimbabwe-Rhodesia made changes to the army in 1979 and shortly after Zimbabwe disbanded all the regiments Rhodesian Security Forces in favour of the Zimbabwe Defence Forces in 1979–1981.

Up to this point the Security Forces wore the beret as the primary working dress and service dress headgear. Like most countries formerly associated with the British Empire, Berets were coloured according to unit or service branch, with a distinctive regimental cap badge pinned above the left eye. The Rhodesian Security Forces were integrated into the new Zimbabwe Defence Forces in 1980.

Rhodesia introduced the brown beret as a new colour for specialist berets, for use of the Selous Scouts, which has since been used for specialist units in the Finnish and Brazilian forces, and with the New Zealand SAS

Rhodesian beret colours were as follows:

Like the United Kingdom, Rhodesia also used flashes and hackles behind cap badges on their berets, such as:
 The blue, yellow and red shield on the medical corps beret
 The blue diamond flash on the military police beret
The red outline of the Rhodesian Artillery beret
The red tombstone of the Grey Scouts beret
The red diamond hacking of the Rhodesian Regiment beret (similar to that of the KRRC)
The Blue and White hackle of the 4th Battalion Rhodesian Regiment Beret

Romania

Russia

The Soviet Union's beret color scheme detailed below (e.g. for airborne troops and naval infantry) remained in effect in post-1991 Russia. In the late 1990s the Russian Ministry of Extreme Situations introduced orange berets for its own troops.

In the Soviet Union berets were sewn together from three pieces of material with four air holes, two at each side, worn with the service badge centered between the eyes and draped to the right in most circumstances. When appearing in public on parade, the berets were draped to the left side so that the insignia shows to observing dignitaries and the public.

In 2011 the Russian defence ministry authorised the wearing of berets by all non-naval military personnel as part of their field uniforms.

The current beret colour scheme is:

S
Saudi Arabia

Senegal
 Tan/sand – Bataillon de Parachutistes (Army Parachute Battalion)
 Brown – Bataillon de Commandos (Army Commando Battalion)
 Black – Detachment Forces Speciales (Special Forces Detachment)
 Orange – Groupement Mobil d'Intervention (Mobile Intervention Group)
 Blue – Legion de Gendarmerie d'Intervention (Gendarmerie Intervention Unit)
 Green – Compagnie Fusilier de Marine Comandos (COFUMACO)(Navy Marine Commandos)

Serbia

The Serbian Armed Forces are wearing berets as their standard headdress.

Singapore

The Singapore Armed Forces and Singapore Police Force have adopted the beret as their standard headdress. The different color divisions are as follows:

The berets are all adorned with the Singapore Armed Forces coat of arms, with the exception of the Air Force beret, Military Police beret, navy beret, Digital and Intelligence Service beret and police beret which are adorned with their respective cap-badge. Officers in the navy have a different cap-badge from the ratings. Officers of the rank of colonel and above have a different cap-badge.

Green – National Cadet Corps (Land)
Blue – National Cadet Corps (Air)
Black – National Cadet Corps (Sea)
Dark blue – National Police Cadet Corps
Black – National Civil Defence Cadet Corps

All berets have the National Cadet Corps, National Police Cadet Corps or National Civil Defence Cadet Corps crest on the front.

Slovakia

Slovenia
Rifle green – Special forces
Green – Military Police
Olive green – Signal units
Black – Armour units
Maroon – motorised infantry/Paratroopers
Dark blue – Navy units
Light blue – Air force
Grey – Mountain units
Sand – NBC units
Red – Guard unit

Somalia

The Somali Armed Forces has the beret has the standard headgear since its inception in 1960. Each function within the security forces of Somalia has a unique colour.

 South Africa 

The South African National Defence Force wears the beret as its standard headgear. The different color divisions are as follows:

The berets are all adorned with the unit's insignia. Some of the traditional units wear other headgear - for example, the Cape Town Highlanders Regiment and the band of the South African Military Health Service.

Outside of Army, the South African Military Health Service wear light maroon berets. The South African Special Forces Brigade which is a separate entity, not part of the army, also wear the Maroon beret which is traditional for parachute units in the western world.

South Korea
Berets are worn by members of the Republic of Korea Army and some elite units of the South Korean Military, including:

Black – Army Republic of Korea Army Special Warfare Command (with yellow backing), Reserve Officer Training Corps, KATUSA (Korean Augmentation to the United States Army)
Dark green – Army
Dark blue – Air Force Military Police
Red – Air Force Combat Control Team (CCT)
Maroon – Air Force Special Air Rescue Team (SART)
Green – Marine Corps Force Reconnaissance, Marine Corps armoured units
Grey – Navy UDT/SEAL Team (Naval Special Warfare Flotilla)
Camouflage – Army armoured units
Reddish brown – Army aviation
UN blue – United Nations peacekeepers

Other than these units, several secret commando units (mostly disbanded in the mid-1990s, among them the "Unit 684" which became infamous for its mutiny) formed to infiltrate North Korea during the Cold War days wore black berets and adorned them with the badges of individual units. Korean liaison soldiers serving in the U.S. Eighth Army (KATUSA) have also been wearing black berets along with American uniforms since that beret became a standard headgear of the U.S. Army in 2001.

South Vietnam
American advisers assigned to these units wore the berets.

Red – Paratroopers
Green – Marines, LLDB
Maroon – Rangers
Black – Navy Junk Force
Black – Palace guards
Tan – political officers

Soviet Union

In the Soviet Union berets were sewn together from three pieces of material with four air holes, two at each side, worn with the service badge centered between the eyes and draped to the right in most circumstances. When appearing in public on parade, the berets were draped to the left side so that the insignia shows to observing dignitaries and the public. Berets were worn only by:

During this period berets were also worn by female personnel of the Armed Forces for everyday and parade uniform. The colour of the beret corresponded with that of the main uniform (e.g. Army and Air Force everyday uniform – olive, Navy uniform – navy blue or white, Army parade uniform – sea green, Air Force parade uniform – dark blue).

Spain

The beret is used in the various armed forces of Spain. The colours used are:

Sri Lanka

Maroon – Army Commando Regiment
Black – Sri Lanka Armoured Corps, Army Special Forces Regiment, Navy Special Boat Squadron, Air Force Regiment Special Force
Commando green – Sri Lanka Sinha Regiment, Mechanized Infantry Regiment, Military Intelligence Corps, Sri Lanka Army Women Corps, Sri Lanka Rifle Corps, Special Task Force
Green – Gajaba Regiment (Infantry)
Blue – Vijayabahu Infantry Regiment, The Gemunu Watch (Infantry) & All Other Ranks of Artillery, Engineers, Signals, Light Infantry & all Service Corps
Khaki – All Officers of Sri Lanka Artillery, Corps of Engineers, Corps of Signals, Light Infantry, Service Corps, Corps Engineer Services, General Service Corps, Electrical & Mechanical Engineers, Sri Lanka National Guard, Sri Lanka Army Pioneer Corps
Red – Military Police
Dark blue – Sri Lanka Air Force

Sweden

The beret is used in the various armed forces of Sweden.

2015 regulations:

2009 regulations:

Sudan
The beret is worn by all police and military personnel.
Maroon – Paratroops
Pink – special police

Switzerland
Since 1995, when it replaced the grey side cap, the beret is worn with the dress uniform and with the personally issued battle dress uniform by all Swiss soldiers. In training, a black beret (without insignia) is worn by mechanised units, otherwise a camouflage-coloured field cap is worn instead.

The colours used are:
 Black — armoured and mechanised units; signals and headquarters troops; NBC specialists; intelligence, military justice and general staff personnel
 Green — infantry, musicians
 Red — artillery
 Deep blue — Air Force
 Blue — medical personnel
 Dark red — logistics troops
 Grey — military police
 Light blue — troops on UN missions
 Tan (Sand) – Special Operation Forces

T
Thailand
The beret is used in the various armed forces of Thailand. The colours used are:
 Maroon – Airborne units, 1st Special Warfare Division, 31st Ranger Regiment
 Khaki green – Army Reserve Force Students
 Black – All other Army units, Air Force, Thahan Phran (Army Paramilitary), Airborne Police units, Border Patrol Police (BPP)
 Camouflage – Royal Thai Marine Recon, Marine Paramilitary and Navy SEALs
 Navy blue – Volunteer Defense Corps (VDC) Part of Department Of Provincial Administration (DOPA), Ministry of Interior
 Scarlet – Speciel Operation of Royal Thai Air Force (Commando)
 UN blue – Personnel serving with the United Nations on peacekeeping missions

The black beret is also worn by ordinary police in certain situations.

Togo
The beret colours worn by the Togolese Army are as follows:
Black — Armoured Corps
Maroon — Para-Commando Regiment
Green — Presidential Guard Commando Regiment.
Dark blue – All other Arms and Corps

Turkey
The beret is used in the various armed forces of Turkey. The colours used are:

 Black – Armoured Corps of Turkish Land Forces
 Blue – Elite units of Turkish Armed Forces
 Dark blue – Personnel of General Directorate of Security riot team and Police Counter Attack Team
 Navy blue – VIP guard team of the Turkish Air Force
 UN blue – Personnel serving with the United Nations
 Green – Personnel of Gendarmerie General Command and General Directorate of Security
 Bluish green – Personnel of Police Special Operation Department
 Dark green – Overseas deployment personnel of Turkish Armed Forces
 Maroon – Personnel of Special Forces Command
 Red – Personnel of National Intelligence Organization
 Tan – CSAR units of the Turkish Air Force

U
Ukraine

The beret is used in the various armed forces of Ukraine. The Ukrainian armed forces formerly wore a Soviet style beret sewn together from three pieces of material with four air holes, two at each side. This was changed to a smaller beret moulded from one piece of material with no air holes. The colours are:

United Arab Emirates
The Armed Forces of the UAE and National Service use berets with distinct colours to display the specific branch of the armed forces. All berets displays the United Arab Emirates Armed Forces emblem.

Emirati military personnel may also choose to wear military camo coloured ghutra in a turban fashion in keeping with traditional Arabic attire.

The colours are as follows:

United Kingdom

The British Army beret dates back to 1918 when the French 70th Chasseurs alpins were training with the British Tank Corps. The Chasseurs alpins wore a distinctive large beret and Major-General Sir Hugh Elles, the TC's Colonel, realised this style of headdress would be a practical option for his tank crews, forced to work in a reduced space. He thought, however, that the Chasseur beret was "too sloppy" and the Basque-style beret of the French tank crews was "too skimpy", so a compromise based on the Scottish tam o'shanter was designed and submitted for the approval of George V in November 1923. It was adopted in March 1924.

During the Second World War, the use of the black beret was extended to all the regiments of the Royal Armoured Corps in 1940. The maroon beret was adopted by British airborne forces in 1941 and the green beret by the Commandos in late 1942. A khaki beret was worn by the Reconnaissance Corps from 1941 until 1944, and the Royal Air Force Regiment adopted a blue-grey beret in 1943. Later in the war, a rather baggier beret-like hat, called the General Service Cap, was issued to all ranks of the British Army (with RAC, parachute, commando, Scottish and Irish units excepted), to replace the earlier Field Service Cap. The GS Cap was not popular, and after the war was replaced with a true beret.

Today, English and Welsh military units wear a beret (the Royal Regiment of Scotland, Royal Irish Regiment and London Irish, wear the tam o'shanter and the caubeen respectively, the Scots Guards and Irish Guards, however, wear berets). Many of these berets are in distinctive colours and all are worn with the cap badge of the service, regiment or corps. The cap badge for all services in the UK is usually worn directly over the left eye.

Beret colours

The colours are as follows:

General rule for wearing a British Army berets taught at training depots is to shape the head dress back and to the right for the material and to have the leather band level around the head with the cap badge two fingers above the left eye. Scottish Infantry have different rules for the Tamo'shanter with the cap badge worn on the left side of the head.

Other adornments

Some regiments and corps wear a coloured backing behind the cap badge. These include:

Foot Guards: blue-red-blue patch (less the officers of the Scots Guards, who wear a patch of Royal Stewart tartan)
Honourable Artillery Company: black circle
Princess of Wales's Royal Regiment: blue-yellow-blue patch
Royal Anglian Regiment: small black 'tombstone'
Queen Alexandra's Royal Army Nursing Corps: red patch
Royal Army Medical Corps: dull cherry oval patch
Army Air Corps: black patch
Army Physical Training Corps: patch in corps colours
Royal Marines: 'red tombstone' (only on dark blue beret worn by those who are not commando-qualified including Royal Marines Cadets)
Royal Welsh Regiment and Mercian Regiment: green badge outline and square respectively
Queen's Royal Lancers: red patch
Household Cavalry: blue-red-blue patch
The Royal Dragoon Guards: red diamond patch
Yorkshire Regiment: Brunswick (British racing) green
Royal Scots Dragoon Guards: black patch (worn in mourning for Emperor Nicholas II of Russia, who was their colonel-in-chief at the time of his murder)
King's Royal Hussars: red patch
Royal Wessex Yeomanry: black patch behind the cap badge
Royal Gibraltar Regiment: red-grey-red patch
 Royal Regiment of Fusiliers: feather hackle on the beret. Other ranks of the Royal Welsh also wear hackles.

Members of the Royal Tank Regiment, 4/73 (Sphinx) Special OP Battery Royal Artillery, Royal Regiment of Fusiliers, Army Air Corps, Parachute Regiment, SAS and Intelligence Corps wear berets in Nos 1, 2, 3 and 6, Dress. Other English and Welsh Regiments and Corps wear peaked caps in these orders of dress. Troops from other services, regiments or corps on attachment to units with distinctive coloured berets often wear those berets (with their own cap badge). Colonels, brigadiers and generals usually continue to wear the beret of the regiment or corps to which they used to belong with the cap badge distinctive to their rank.

Old units

Former regiments and corps, now amalgamated:

Dark blue – Queens Regiment, Royal Hampshire Regiment
Khaki – Green Howards, King's Own Royal Border Regiment, Prince of Wales's Own Regiment of Yorkshire, Duke of Wellington's Regiment, Reconnaissance Corps, infantry motor battalions in World War II
Dark (Rifle) green – Light Infantry, Royal Green Jackets, Devonshire and Dorset Light Infantry, Royal Gloucestershire, Berkshire and Wiltshire Light Infantry, Rifle Brigade, King's Royal Rifle Corps, 2nd King Edward VII's Own Gurkha Rifles (The Sirmoor Rifles), 6th Queen Elizabeth's Own Gurkha Rifles, 7th Duke of Edinburgh's Own Gurkha Rifles, 10th Princess Mary's Own Gurkha Rifles
Black – All Royal Armoured Corps regiments in World War II (other than officers in Inns of Court Regiment), Royal Observer Corps, Westminster Dragoons
Maroon – Glider Pilot Regiment and glider-borne units
Green – Women's Royal Army Corps, women in Officers Training Corps (now wear dark blue), officers in Inns of Court Regiment
Brown with a broad crimson headband and NO hat badge – 11th Hussars (PAO)

United States

Berets were originally worn by select forces in the United States Army. The first were worn during World War II, when a battalion of the 509th Parachute Infantry Regiment were presented maroon berets by their British counterparts. Though unofficial at first, the green beret of the US Army Special Forces was formally adopted in 1961. Maroon airborne and black US Army Ranger berets were formally authorized in the 1970s.

"D" Troop 17th Cavalry were authorized a maroon beret in Vietnam.

After the Vietnam War, morale in the US Army waned. In response, from 1973 through 1979 HQDA permitted local commanders to encourage morale-enhancing uniform distinctions; however, these distinctions were allowed to be worn only on the post. Consequently, many units embraced various colored berets, for example armor and armored cavalry units often adopted the black beret. Similarly many other units embraced various colored berets in an attempt to improve dwindling morale. In particular, the First Cavalry Division assigned various colored berets to its three-pronged TRICAP approach. In this implementation, armored cavalry, airmobile infantry units, air cavalry units, division artillery units, and division support units all wore different colored berets, including black, light blue, Kelly green, and red. The 101st Airborne Division was authorised a dark-blue beret.

In 1975 all female soldiers of the Women's Army Corps were authorized to wear a black beret variant as standard headgear for the service uniform.

In 1975 the 172nd Light Infantry Brigade at Fort Richardson and Fort Wainwright, Alaska, wore olive-drab berets.

In 2001, Army Chief of Staff Eric Shinseki ordered the black beret worn as standard headgear army-wide, a controversial decision because it was previously reserved for the rangers. The rangers were then authorized to wear a tan beret, exclusive to them. The decision was implemented in hopes of boosting morale among conventional units. However, many soldiers began complaining that the new black beret was not practical with the utility uniform. In June 2011, Army Secretary John McHugh, acting on the recommendations made by Chief of Staff Martin Dempsey and Sergeant Major of the Army Raymond F. Chandler, once again chose the traditional patrol cap to be worn with the utility uniform. The black beret may be authorized with utility uniforms at commander's discretion for special ceremonies. The beret remains part of the Army's dress uniform for all units.

United States Army berets now use the following distinctive colors:

Special forces, ranger, and airborne unit berets sport distinctive organizational flashes. All other units use a standard pale blue flash bordered with 13 white stars. Officers wear their rank insignia within the flash, while enlisted ranks wear their distinctive unit insignia.

In the United States Navy, female officers and sailors were allowed to wear black berets instead of a combination hat or garrison cap while in service uniforms until 2016. The black berets were phased out in October of that year due to a lack of widespread use and a desire by the U.S. Navy to make its uniforms more unisex in appearance. During the Vietnam War, the U.S. Navy created special boat teams, unofficially dubbed the brown-water navy, to patrol coastlines, estuaries and rivers. Naval personnel assigned to these teams wore black berets as part of their uniform, as portrayed in the movie Apocalypse Now. U.S. Navy SEAL teams serving in Vietnam wore camouflage berets in the field, the only beret somewhat standardized in the SEALs.

Uruguay
 Military
 Grey – Army 14th Parachute Battalion
 Green – Army 13th Armor Battalion (Combined Arms)
 Police
 Black – Police Coraceros Regiment

V
Vatican State

The Pontifical Swiss Guard wears large black berets.

Venezuela

Berets are worn by some units in the Venezuelan National Armed Forces, with distinctive colors for some units or functions. The beret colours are as follows:

Note: Before the conversion to the red berets, the Caracas Battalion wore dark blue berets similar to those used by the O'Leary Battalion.

Note: Bolivarian National Police general issue red berets (since 2017).

Vietnam

Berets used by the Vietnam Coast Guard and the Vietnam People's Navy are:

 Blue – Enlisted Seamen
 Black – Officers and NCOs
 Dark blue – Marine Commandos and Naval Infantrymen

During the celebration of the 40th Reunification Day, the People's Army of Vietnam presented new models of berets:
 Green and camouflaged berets are worn by Infantry Reconnaissance troopers and Ground Commandos respectively. 
 Red berets are worn by Airborne Forces.

Army's servicemen served within the United Nations will bear the UN blue beret.

 Y 

 Yemen 

Berets are worn as standard headgear in the Yemeni Armed Forces, with most beret colors inherited from the South Yemeni armed forces.

Z
Zambia
 Black – Armoured troops
 Green – Zambia rifles (Infantry)
 Maroon – Paracommando
 Scarlet – Military police
 Dark blue – Worn by all other Army units
 Khaki – Colonels and general officers with combat uniform
 Grey-blue – Air Force personnel
 Khaki-black – Zambia National Service personnel

Zimbabwe
Green – Infantry
Black – Armoured Regiment
Maroon – Parachute Battalion
Tartan green – Commando Battalion
Tan – Special Air Service
Yellow – Presidential Guard
Cherry red – Military Police
Blue-grey – Zimbabwe Air Force
Dark blue – All other units

International forces

United Nations

Multinational Force and Observers

African Union

Camouflage berets

A camouflage beret''' is intended for use on the battlefield when wearing combat fatigues. They are mostly issued to the likes of special forces, particularly in jungle warfare operations.

History

Camouflage berets possibly originate from the General Service cap "Cap, General Service" issued to the British Army in a Khaki material before the introduction of berets. It was first introduced under "Army Council Instruction 1407" of September 1943. This cap was designed to replace the "Field Service cap" or "FS Cap" that had been worn since the outbreak of war. These caps were issued in priority to units serving overseas. UK based units got theirs later on. It was at first unpopular due to its over large appearance. This cap was not a beret. It was made from several pieces of drab cloth material, whereas a beret was a one piece item. It was based on the Scottish balmoral bonnet in design. First issues were made from the same gaberdine cloth as the old "FS" cap. Badges worn on it were the conventional officers' bronze, and ORs' badges in both plastic and metal. Units which had special distinctions could still wear these on the "GS" cap. The General Service cap was worn by regulation one inch above the eyebrows, with the badge over the left eye and the cap pulled down to the right. But many wartime photos will show it worn pushed back on the head, which seemed to be a fashion with many soldiers late in the war.

Officers could only obtain the cap upon repayment to the RAOC. They were not allowed to buy the cap until their unit had been issued with it wholesale. Higher ranking officers often got away with wearing a khaki beret, which was against regulations. Fashion conscious ORs would also risk punishment from NCOs/officers buying one of these for "walking out".

Not exactly camouflage, but an early example is the Jungle Beret issued to the Australian Army during WW2.

Users
 – Jungle Troops (Brigada de Monte XII "General Manuel Obligado")
 – Special Forces "Bolivian Condors"
 – Jungle Troops
 – During the 80s, camo berets were issued to some of the recon forces of PLA. It has no cap badge on it.
 – Naval Infantry, Armoured forces of Bornholm (Bornholms Værn's Marineinfantery) Disbanded
 – IWIA (indigenous tribal members unit) forces
 – Kfir Brigade (Urban Combat)
 – Special Naval Forces
 – 7th Infantry Company "Macho de Monte"; Comando Operacional de Fuerzas Expeciales (Cadre)
 – Philippine Air Force pararescue
 – "Flechas" and Guinea 3rd Commando Company 
 – 32 Buffalo Battalion, 61 Mechanised Battalion Group and the Special Task Force
 – Army armoured units
 – Royal Thai Marine Corps and Navy SEALs

See also
Uniform beret, for the use of berets as uniform headgear outside the military
Military berets by color:
Black beret
Blue beret
Green beret
Maroon beret
Red beret
Tan beret

References

Military uniforms
Berets
Military hats